David J. Farber (born April 17, 1934) is a professor of computer science, noted for his major contributions to programming languages and computer networking. He is currently the Distinguished Professor and Co-Director of Cyber Civilization Research Center at Keio University in Japan. He has been called the "grandfather of the Internet".

Career
Farber graduated from the Stevens Institute of Technology with a M.E. degree in electrical engineering in 1956 and a second M.S. degree in mathematics in 1961.  He then began an 11-year career at Bell Laboratories, where he helped design the first electronic switching system (ESS-1) and the SNOBOL programming languages. He subsequently held industry positions at the Rand Corporation and Scientific Data Systems, followed by academic positions at the University of California, Irvine, the University of Delaware, and Carnegie Mellon University.  He was awarded an honorary doctorate in engineering from the Stevens Institute in 1999.

At Irvine his research work was focused on creating the world's first operational distributed computer system. While a member of the electrical engineering department of the University of Delaware, he helped conceive and organize the major American research networks CSNET, NSFNet, and the National Research and Education Network (NREN). He helped create the NSF/DARPA-funded Gigabit Network Test bed Initiative and served as the Chairman of the Gigabit Test bed Coordinating Committee.

Farber subsequently was appointed Alfred Fitler Moore Professor of Telecommunication Systems at the University of Pennsylvania where he also held appointments as Professor of Business and Public Policy at the Wharton School of Business and as a Faculty Associate of the Annenberg School for Communication. He served as Chief Technologist at the US Federal Communications Commission (2000–2001) while on leave from the university.

Farber is a founding editor of ICANNWatch. He serves on the board of advisers of Context Relevant and The Liquid Information Company.

Honors and community service
Farber is an AAAS Fellow, IEEE Fellow, ACM Fellow, and recipient of the 1995 SIGCOMM Award for lifelong contributions to computer communications. He has served on the board of directors of the Electronic Frontier Foundation, the Electronic Privacy Information Center advisory board, the Board of Trustees of the Internet Society, and as a member of the Presidential Advisory Committee on High Performance Computing and Communications, Information Technology and Next Generation Internet. He runs a large (25,000+ readership)  mailing list called Interesting-People. In 2012, in memory of his son, he established the Joseph M. Farber prize at the Stevens Institute of Technology, which recognizes a graduating senior majoring in one of the disciplines of the College of Arts and Letters who displays a keen interest in and concern for civil liberties and their importance in preserving and protecting human rights.

On August 3, 2013, Farber was inducted into the Pioneers Circle of the Internet Hall of Fame. He was elected as the AAAS Fellow by the Council of the American Association for the Advancement of Science in 2018.

References

External links

 
 Topicbox: Interesting-People
 Farberisms 

American computer scientists
Carnegie Mellon University faculty
Fellows of the Association for Computing Machinery
1934 births
Living people
Scientists from Pittsburgh
Programming language designers
Place of birth missing (living people)
Internet pioneers
Fellow Members of the IEEE